Rhythm of Life is the 1983 debut album by Paul Haig. The phrase may also refer to:
"Rhythm of Life", a song by Oleta Adams from the 1990 album Circle of One
"Rhythm of Life", a song by Richard Marx from the 1987 album Richard Marx
"Rhythm of Life", a song by Status Quo from the 2002 album Heavy Traffic
Rhythm of Life, a 2008 Singaporean television series
"The Rhythm of Life", a song from the 1966 Broadway musical Sweet Charity